Derbyshire Healthcare NHS Foundation Trust was established on 1 February 2011, when Monitor, the Independent Regulator of NHS Foundation Trusts, authorised Derbyshire Mental Health Services NHS Trust to become a Foundation Trust.

In April 2011, the trust became the provider of Children’s Universal and Specialist Services for Derby city following a tender process. In addition as part of the Transforming Community Services programme, Community Paediatric Services and Substance Misuse Services from NHS Derby City were transferred into the organisation. 

The trust is the largest provider of mental health, learning disabilities, and substance misuse services in Derbyshire, primarily serving the people of Derbyshire and Derby city which has a combined population of approximately 1 million, with 71 languages spoken. The trust runs a Centre for Research and Development which focuses on specific clinical areas including compassion-focused care, dementia and delirium, and the prevention of suicide and self-harm.

The trust has approximately 3,000 staff who cover a range of services over 66 sites throughout Derby city and Derbyshire. These include community settings, inpatient (hospital) units and specialist locations such as courts and prisons. 

The trust's inpatient units are as follows:

•	The Radbourne Unit in Derby, which provides four acute mental health inpatient wards (including a recovery-focused centre called the Hope and Resilience Hub), an enhanced care ward, mental health and substance misuse liaison services for the Accident & Emergency department at Royal Derby Hospital, mental health crisis services, occupational therapy services and an ECT (Electro-Convulsive Therapy) suite.

•	The Hartington Unit in Chesterfield, which provides three acute mental health inpatient wards, an outpatient unit, mental health crisis home treatment teams, and mental health and substance misuse liaison services for the Accident & Emergency department at Chesterfield Royal Hospital.

•	Older people’s mental health services; based at London Road Community Hospital in Derby, a specialist dementia ward on the Kingsway site in Derby and a Dementia Rapid Response Team to support people with dementia to remain in their community for as long as possible, as well as physiotherapy services.

•	Forensic and rehabilitation services, including gender specific low-secure services on the Kingsway site in Derby, prison in-reach and criminal justice liaison teams.

In 2013, the trust began a large-scale transformation programme which has resulted in the establishment of a neighbourhood-based approach to its adult community mental health services. Services are now provided on a needs-led basis, regardless of the service receiver's age. The staff within the eight neighbourhood teams work closely with each other and other local health professionals, and draw on local community resources to help people rebuild their lives after an episode of mental ill health.

In 2015, working in partnership with charitable organisations Aquarius and Phoenix Futures, the trust secured the contract to provide an integrated drug and alcohol recovery service within Derby city from 1 April 2015. Following a competitive tender process, the three partners were awarded the three-year contract by Derby City Council to deliver an integrated drug and alcohol treatment system, including both community and complex support.

In 2015, the trust again secured the contract to provide children's services for Derby city, starting in 2016. Earlier in the year, the trust's health visiting service secured level 3 of Unicef's Baby Friendly Initiative for Derby city.

In 2015, an employment tribunal ruled that, in 2013, the then chairman of the trust colluded with the chief executive to dismiss the director of human resources after she rejected the chairman's advances. The director of HR was awarded compensation of £832,711 in February 2016.

It announced plans to explore a merger with Derbyshire Community Health Services NHS Foundation Trust in November 2016. In June 2017 it was decided that the two trusts would not merge, but would continue to work closely together.

See also
 List of NHS trusts

References

External links
 Monitor
 Derbyshire Healthcare

NHS foundation trusts
Health in Derbyshire